Sterling Cotton Mill, also known as the Franklinton Cotton Mill, is a historic cotton mill complex located at 108-112 East Green Street in Franklinton, Franklin County, North Carolina.  The main mill is a one and two-story L-shaped brick building with Industrial Italianate style design elements.  The mill consists of five sections: the original gabled one-story section rising to a two-story section at the east end (1895); a two-story addition (1914), a one-story addition (1960s); pre-1926 "cotton sheds"; and a small two-story brick office (1966).  Associated with the mill is the contributing detached chimney stack.  The mill was built by Samuel C. Vann, whose son Aldridge built the Aldridge H. Vann House.  The mill closed in 1991.

It was listed on the National Register of Historic Places in 1996. The Sterling Cotton Mill is now home to the Lofts at Sterling Mill (apartments) and Inter Technologies.

References

External links
The Lofts at Sterling Mill

Cotton mills in the United States
Industrial buildings and structures on the National Register of Historic Places in North Carolina
Italianate architecture in North Carolina
Industrial buildings completed in 1895
Buildings and structures in Franklin County, North Carolina
National Register of Historic Places in Franklin County, North Carolina